Andreo Cseh (born András Cseh; 12 September 1895, in Marosludas, Hungary – 9 March 1979, in the Hague, Netherlands) was a Hungarian/Dutch Roman Catholic priest and Esperantist known for inventing the Cseh method of Esperanto instruction.

Biography

Cseh, an Esperantist since 1910, became a Catholic priest in 1919. In Sibiu in 1920, he designed the famous Cseh method of Esperanto instruction. Because of the method's success, Cseh was invited to Târgu Mureș, where he led several Esperanto courses. From there he went to Cluj, where he led courses and began to reorganize the Romanian Esperanto movement. In the autumn of 1922, he traveled to Bucharest on the invitation of Henriko Fischer-Galați, with whom he founded the Romanian Esperanto Center (Esperanto-Centro Rumana). He spent two years in București and neighboring cities, teaching and advertising the Esperanto movement.

Starting in 1921, Cseh was a chief delegate to the World Esperanto Association. In 1924, his bishop, Count Majláth, gave him leave to dedicate himself completely to the dissemination of Esperanto. In the same year, he became secretary of the Internacia Centra Komitato and was given the task of traveling through various countries to spread Esperanto. He participated in the organization of the Esperanto World Congresses in Geneva in 1925, in Danzig in 1927, and in Budapest in 1929.

In the autumn of 1927 he was invited by the mayor of Stockholm and Prince Charles to lead Esperanto courses in Sweden, including in the Swedish parliament. In April 1929 the first printed edition of his course appeared in book form, written in shorthand and published in Stockholm.

Having led courses in Estonia, France, Germany, Latvia, the Netherlands, Norway, Poland, and Switzerland, he moved to the Netherlands for good in 1930. Everywhere, his courses were such an extraordinary success that Esperanto magazines began to talk about a "renaissance" of Esperanto. Thus, demand grew for courses intended for instructors of Esperanto. Cseh led international schools for educators, first in Budapest (1929) and later in Arnhem, Netherlands, for many years.

On 24 May 1930 he, Julia Isbrücker, and her husband founded the Internacia Esperanto-Instituto. As a result, the World Esperanto Association became dissatisfied with him, and he was not permitted to participate in the 1931 World Congress in Krakow. In 1932, he founded and became the editor-in-chief of the Esperanto magazine La Praktiko, which was published until 1970. (In its later years, starting in 1964, the magazine was run by the World Esperanto Association.)

In 1931, he traveled to Berlin several times to teach.

In 1942, during the German occupation of the Netherlands, Cseh and Isbrücker held a secret meeting to found the Universala Ligo, a World Federalist organization which they continued to lead for years.

Revocation and reinstatement of priesthood

Cseh led successful Esperanto courses for all types of people, unaware that due to concerns about marriages of mixed religions, the current bishop of Harlem, J.D.J. Aengenent, whose diocese included the Hague, prohibited his priests from giving lessons to groups that included both Catholics and Protestants. As a result, Aengenent used his ecclesiastical right to prohibit Cseh from staying in the diocese of Harlem. Cseh's comprehension of Dutch was poor, so he did not fully comprehend Aengenent's order; for this reason, he continued to teach his Esperanto courses as he had before. After some time, Aegenent responded by revoking Cseh's priesthood. In the Huize Royal retirement home where Cseh was living at the time, the leader of the Parish, Father Genemans, visited Cseh to ask him about his life. He decided to take steps to allow Cseh to attain priesthood once again. As a result, on 6 January 1978, Cseh received a touching letter from Monsignor Zwartkruis, then bishop of Harlem, which informed him that his rights as priest had been reinstated. Copies of the letter were sent to the bishop of Rotterdam, Monsignor Simonis, and to the bishop of Transylvania.

The Cseh Method 

The Cseh method consists of:
 Not using a textbook
 Not using the students' native language, but instead explaining new words using words that have already been learned
 Having the students answer in unison
 Using conversation about current events rather than artificial examples
 Thoroughly using humor and jokes
 Allowing the students to discover the rules of the language and construct the grammatical system themselves

Literature about Cseh and his method 
 Esperanto en perspektivo ("Esperanto in perspective"), London, Rotterdam, 1974
 Enciklopedio de Esperanto ("Encyclopedia of Esperanto"), Budapest, 1933
 Vortoj de Andreo Cseh ("Words of Andreo Cseh"), Artur E. Iltis, Saarbrücken, 1984 / Internacia Esperanto-Instituto, Hague, 2003
 Metodologio de lingvostudado kaj parolproprigo ("Methodology of language study and proper pronunciation"), D-ro I. Szerdahelyi, Budapest, 1975
 Memorlibro omaĝe al Andreo Cseh ("Memorial book in homage to Andreo Cseh"), edited with an attached text by Katalin Smidéliusz, Szombathely, 1995
 Vortoj de Andreo Cseh ("Words of Andreo Cseh"), Ed Borsboom, Internacia Esperanto-Instituto, 2003
 Vivo de Andreo Cseh ("Life of Andreo Cseh"), Ed Borsboom, Internacia Esperanto-Instituto, 2003

References 

People from Luduș
Dutch Esperantists
Hungarian Esperantists
20th-century Dutch Roman Catholic priests
20th-century Hungarian Roman Catholic priests
1895 births
1979 deaths
Esperanto educators